In six-dimensional geometry, a pentellated 6-orthoplex is a convex uniform 6-polytope with 5th order truncations of the regular 6-orthoplex.

There are unique 16 degrees of pentellations of the 6-orthoplex with permutations of truncations, cantellations, runcinations, and sterications. Ten are shown, with the other 6 more easily constructed as a pentellated 6-cube. The simple pentellated 6-orthoplex (Same as pentellated 5-cube) is also called an expanded 6-orthoplex, constructed by an expansion operation applied to the regular 6-orthoplex. The highest form, the pentisteriruncicantitruncated 6-orthoplex, is called an omnitruncated 6-orthoplex with all of the nodes ringed.

Pentitruncated 6-orthoplex

Alternate names 
 Teritruncated hexacontatetrapeton (Acronym: tacox) (Jonathan Bowers)

Images

Penticantellated 6-orthoplex

Alternate names 
 Terirhombated hexacontitetrapeton (Acronym: tapox) (Jonathan Bowers)

Images

Penticantitruncated 6-orthoplex

Alternate names 
 Terigreatorhombated hexacontitetrapeton (Acronym: togrig) (Jonathan Bowers)

Images

Pentiruncitruncated 6-orthoplex

Alternate names 
 Teriprismatotruncated hexacontitetrapeton (Acronym: tocrax) (Jonathan Bowers)

Images

Pentiruncicantitruncated 6-orthoplex

Alternate names 
 Terigreatoprismated hexacontitetrapeton (Acronym: tagpog) (Jonathan Bowers)

Images

Pentistericantitruncated 6-orthoplex

Alternate names 
 Tericelligreatorhombated hexacontitetrapeton (Acronym: tecagorg) (Jonathan Bowers)

Images

Related polytopes
These polytopes are from a set of 63 uniform 6-polytopes generated from the B6 Coxeter plane, including the regular 6-cube or 6-orthoplex.

Notes

References
 H.S.M. Coxeter: 
 H.S.M. Coxeter, Regular Polytopes, 3rd Edition, Dover New York, 1973 
 Kaleidoscopes: Selected Writings of H.S.M. Coxeter, edited by F. Arthur Sherk, Peter McMullen, Anthony C. Thompson, Asia Ivic Weiss, Wiley-Interscience Publication, 1995,  
 (Paper 22) H.S.M. Coxeter, Regular and Semi Regular Polytopes I, [Math. Zeit. 46 (1940) 380-407, MR 2,10]
 (Paper 23) H.S.M. Coxeter, Regular and Semi-Regular Polytopes II, [Math. Zeit. 188 (1985) 559-591]
 (Paper 24) H.S.M. Coxeter, Regular and Semi-Regular Polytopes III, [Math. Zeit. 200 (1988) 3-45]
 Norman Johnson Uniform Polytopes, Manuscript (1991)
 N.W. Johnson: The Theory of Uniform Polytopes and Honeycombs, Ph.D. 
  x4o3o3o3x3x - tacox, x4o3o3x3o3x - tapox, x4o3o3x3x3x - togrig, x4o3x3o3x3x - tocrax, x4x3o3x3x3x - tagpog, x4x3o3x3x3x - tecagorg

External links 
 
 Polytopes of Various Dimensions
 Multi-dimensional Glossary

6-polytopes